Jo Jole (21 December 1890 – 3 February 1953) was a Dutch footballer. He played in two matches for the Netherlands national football team in 1923.

References

External links
 

1890 births
1953 deaths
Dutch footballers
Netherlands international footballers
Place of birth missing
Association footballers not categorized by position